María Araceli Vázquez Camacho (born 16 March 1948) is a Mexican politician from the Party of the Democratic Revolution. From 2009 to 2012 she served as Deputy of the LXI Legislature of the Mexican Congress representing the Federal District.

References

1948 births
Living people
Politicians from Mexico City
Women members of the Chamber of Deputies (Mexico)
Party of the Democratic Revolution politicians
21st-century Mexican politicians
21st-century Mexican women politicians
Deputies of the LXI Legislature of Mexico
Members of the Chamber of Deputies (Mexico) for Mexico City